Hilarion Tumi Vendégou (4 September 1941 – 11 January 2020) was a French politician, the high chief of the Isle of Pines, in New Caledonia, and the mayor of the commune. He was recognised as grand chef in 1974, but, due to a violent succession dispute with his relative Jean-Marie Vendégou, was not formally enthroned until 7 July 1979. He was also the mayor of the island commune, until 2014.

On 11 January 2020, Vendégou died at the age of 78.

References

Mayors of places in New Caledonia
Kanak chiefs
2020 deaths
People from the Isle of Pines (New Caledonia)
The Rally (New Caledonia) politicians
1941 births
Senators of New Caledonia